is a Japanese manga artist. She made her professional manga debut in 2001 with Magical ✰ Project. Her list of works include Fall in Love Like a Comic!, Boku no Platinum Lady, Kiss x Kiss, Ikenai Navigation, and Kings of My Love.  


Works

Collaborations

References

External links 
  
 

Manga artists
Living people
1969 births